U.S. Route 14 (US 14) in the state of Illinois is a major arterial that runs southeast from the Wisconsin state line north of Harvard, Illinois, to the north side of Chicago at US 41.

Route description

US 14 begins in Chicago as Broadway on the city's north side. It runs north as Broadway and turns northwest onto Ridge Boulevard. One half block after crossing Clark Street, US 14 turns west onto Peterson Avenue. At Cicero Avenue, Peterson Avenue becomes Caldwell Avenue and travels in a northwest/northern direction entering Niles. US Route 14 joins Illinois Route 43 (IL 43, Waukegan Road) for a short time before turning west onto Dempster Street. US 14 travels west briefly touching Park Ridge and enters Des Plaines. 

Where US 14 crosses Interstate 294 (I-294) is an unusual intersection where all four street names change. From the south is Northwest Highway coming out of Park Ridge and Chicago; from the north is Rand Road. US 14 continues straight west but no longer as Dempster Street, but now as Miner Street. Miner Street begins a northwesterly direction into downtown Des Plaines crossing two intersections of US 45 and US 12. The name Miner Street changes to Northwest Highway after going under a wooden railroad underpass on a large S-curve. U.S. Route 14 continues for most of the rest of its length northwest to Wisconsin designated as Northwest Highway. 

Though the name is not used among locals, the entire portion of US 14 in Illinois is given the honorary name Ronald Reagan Highway, which was named for President Ronald Reagan and is not to be confused with the Ronald Reagan Memorial Tollway.

History
Before the late 1930s, US 14 followed present-day IL 31 south of Crystal Lake, IL 72 east of West Dundee, Nagle Avenue, and Addison Street before terminating at Lake Shore Drive (US 41). In the late 1930s, the designation was rerouted to follow most of its current designation which directly connected to Park Ridge and Niles via Busse Highway and Center Street (now Touhy Avenue) before reaching Caldwell Avenue.

Between 1952 and 1978, US 14 continued towards Foster Avenue to Lake Shore Drive, where it then turned south. It left Lake Shore Drive for Michigan Avenue and then intersected at Jackson Boulevard (part of US 66 before 1974) where it terminated. Since 1978, US 14 now ends at Foster Avenue (US 41) in Uptown.

Major intersections

References

External links

14
 Illinois
Transportation in Chicago
Transportation in Cook County, Illinois
Transportation in Lake County, Illinois
Transportation in McHenry County, Illinois